Aspergillus microthecius (also named Aspergillus quadrilineatus) is a species of fungus in the genus Aspergillus. It is from the Nidulantes section. The species was first described in 1985. It has been reported to produce asperthecin, averufin, 7-methoxyaverufin, sterigmatocystin, versicolourin, desferritriacetylfusigen, echinocandin B, echinocandin E, emericellin, emestrin, aurantioemestrin, dethiosecoemestrin Emindol DA, microperfuranone, penicillin G, quadrilineatin, and sterigmatocystin.

References 

microthecius
Fungi described in 1986